Aldo Monzonis Dueñas (born September 13, 1993, in Guadalajara, Jalisco) is a Mexican professional footballer who plays as a midfielder for Cafetaleros de Chiapas.

External links
 

Living people
1993 births
Mexican footballers
Association football midfielders
Ballenas Galeana Morelos footballers
Club Atlético Zacatepec players
Pioneros de Cancún footballers
Loros UdeC footballers
Cafetaleros de Chiapas footballers
Atlético Reynosa footballers
Correcaminos UAT footballers
Liga MX players
Ascenso MX players
Liga Premier de México players
Tercera División de México players
Footballers from Guadalajara, Jalisco